Sir Thomas Hache II (c. 1380 - 28 April 1436) was a prominent landowning knight from Pembrokeshire, Wales during the feudal period of what is now The United Kingdom.

Life
Hache was the first of three siblings, and the only son born of Thomas Hache I, a wealthy landowner of Wales.  Hache was reportedly a natural at swordplay, with his skills praised by many of his instructors. In about 1400, Hache joined the Welsh Military, though his service was mostly limited to small naval expeditions.

References

External links
 Google Books - Welsh Soldiers
 Google Books - Medieval Wales

Welsh soldiers
1380 births
1436 deaths